The 2021–22 Scottish Junior Cup was the 135th season of the Scottish Junior Cup, the national knockout tournament for member clubs of the Scottish Junior Football Association (SJFA). 

A total of 110 clubs initially entered the competition, reduced from 132 in 2019–20, mainly due to more teams joining the East of Scotland League and clubs that did not retain SJFA membership after moving to the West of Scotland League. In addition, Annbank United, Buckie Rovers, Spey Valley United, and Pumpherston Juniors did not compete.

Auchinleck Talbot were the defending champions. They successfully defended their title for a second time with a 2–0 win over Yoker Athletic in the final.

Calendar 
The dates for each round of the 2021–22 tournament were as follows:

Drawn matches proceeded direct to a penalty shootout, there was no extra time. The semi-finals and final were played at a neutral venue, previously semi-finals were played home and away over two legs.

First round

Draw 
The first and second round draws took place at Thomson Park, Dundee on 3 July 2021. Unlike previous seasons, all clubs—including Auchinleck Talbot, Banks O’ Dee, Cumnock Juniors, Girvan, and Irvine Meadow XI who are also taking part in the Scottish Cup—were entered into the first round draw. 18 clubs received a bye to the second round.

Matches

Second round

Matches

Third round

Matches

Fourth round

Quarter-finals

Semi-finals

Final
The Final of the Scottish Junior Cup was played at Rugby Park, Kilmarnock on Saturday 4 June with a 4.10pm kick off. The game was televised live by BBC Alba.

References 

Scottish Junior Cup seasons
Junior Cup